A liminal deity is a god or goddess in mythology who presides over thresholds, gates, or doorways; "a crosser of boundaries". These gods are believed to oversee a state of transition of some kind; such as, the old to the new, the unconscious to the conscious state, the familiar to the unknown.  

Types of liminal deities include dying-and-rising deities, various agricultural deities, psychopomps and those who descend into the underworld: crossing the threshold between life and death. Vegetation deities mimic the annual dying and returning of plant life, making them seasonally cyclical liminal deities in contrast to the one-time journey typical of the dying-and-rising myth.

Etymology

The word "liminal", first attested to in English in 1884, comes from the Latin word "limen", meaning "threshold". "Liminality" is a term given currency in the twentieth century by British cultural anthropologist by Victor Turner. It is used to describe a state of transition; such as from the old to the new, from the familiar to the unknown, even from an unconscious to the conscious state.

European

Greek mythology 
 Adonis, god of beauty and desire who spent part of his time in the underworld, and part on earth before his tragic death
 Charon, a psychopomp believed to ferry souls between the worlds of the living and the dead
 Dionysus, who in one myth is torn apart by Titans, but brought back to life
 Enodia, goddess of crossroads
 Hecate, goddess of magic and crossroads
 Hermes, god of roads, merchants, travelers, trade, thievery/thieves, cunning, and animal husbandry; messenger of Zeus and psychopomp
 Iris, goddess of the rainbow and messenger of Hera, could travel to Hades and return
 Persephone, often seen as a goddess of spring and new growth was believed to spend part of her time in the underworld, and part on earth

Roman mythology 
 Bacchus, Roman name for Dionysus
 Cardea, goddess of health, thresholds, and door hinges and handles
 Diana, as Diana Trivia she serves as the goddess of three-way crossroads and the underworld; often equated with the Greek Hecate
 Forculus, Lima, and Limentinus, minor deities of thresholds or doorways; see indigitamenta
 Janus, dual-faced god of gates, doors, doorways, beginnings and endings, for whom January is named
 Mercury, messenger god and psychopomp; equivalent to the Greek Hermes and shares several of his functions, such as being a god of commerce, travelers, merchants, and thieves
 Portunus, god of keys, doors, and livestock
 Proserpina, Roman equivalent of Persephone who spent some of her time living in the world of the dead
 Terminus, god who protected boundary markers

Norse mythology 
 Gná, Frigg's personal messenger; she rode the horse Hofvarpnir who could travel over both sea and sky
 Heimdall
 Hermóðr, messenger of the Norse gods; he rode to Hel to plead for Baldr's return, ultimately being unsuccessful
 Odin, god of war and death, among other things; he is described as at least once visiting the underworld on Sleipnir, raising a volva to interrogate, and visiting jotunn on three occasions in their domain in order to gather more wisdom

Baltic mythology 
 Užsparinė, Lithuanian goddess of land borders

Etruscan mythology 
 Culsans, a male deity with two faces, possibly a protector of gateways. Usually equated with the Roman god Janus.

Asian religions

Chinese mythology 
 Chen Huang Shen, the gods of walls and moats. Every major city had a City God appointed by the imperial government
 Menshen, the gods of doors
 Chen Wenlong, god of city walls in Fuzhou

Filipino mythology 
Makiubaya: the Ifugao divinities who watch over the gates of the village
Manduyapit: the Manobo god who ferries departed souls across the red river before going to the afterworld

Korean mythology 
 Jangseung, a totem pole traditionally placed at the edges of villages to mark for village boundaries and frighten away demons; also worshipped as tutelary deities
 Munsin, Korean deity of the door. He was considered one of the most powerful of the house gods (Gashin), especially in Jeju Island

Shinto 
 Izanagi, creator god who descended into Yomi to bring back his wife, only to be repulsed at how hideous she had become, run away, and seal the entrance to Yomi with a rock
 Izanami, creator goddess who died, but could not leave Yomi and thus became queen of the underworld and the dead

Vietnamese mythology 
 Thành hoàng, god bless and protect villages or a larger area
 Môn thần, the gods of doors

Hinduism 
 Agni, god of fire and messenger between gods and mortals, Ganesha seems to have at least partially taken over this role in modern Hinduism
 Ganesha, The god of beginnings. Referred to as the 'Indian Janus' by 18th century scholar William Jones.
 Pushan, solar deity and psychopomp responsible for marriages, journeys, roads, the feeding of cattle, and overseeing the journey of the dead to the afterlife
 Narasimha, presider over the threshold between interior and exterior

Mesopotamian mythology 
 Dumuzi/Tammuz
 Inanna/Ishtar

Phrygian mythology 
 Attis, Phrygian vegetation deity; his self-mutilation, death, and resurrection represents the fruits of the earth, which die in winter only to rise again in the spring.

Middle East and Abrahamic religions

Christianity 
 Jesus Christ is presented as a crosser of borders. The Resurrection of Jesus describes his dying and rising.

African and American religions

African religions 
 Osiris, Ancient Egyptian god of the afterlife whose resurrection became associated with the cycles in nature, in particular the sprouting of vegetation and the annual flooding of the Nile River.
 Legba, phallic crossroad spirit and trickster in West African Vodun and Haitian Vodou. He is the bringer of magic, master diviner and speaker of every language who facilitates communication between man and the gods.  Legba is also the remover of obstacles and the guardian of the home and crossroads.

Afro-American religions 
Elegua (Eshu/Exu in Candomblé), the messenger god and psychopomp in Santería, and Candomblé.

See also

Notes

 
Lists of deities
Mythological archetypes